San Giuseppe di Casto is a frazione (and parish) of the municipality of Andorno Micca, in Piedmont, northern Italy.

Overview

It is a village located some km north-east from the centre of Andorno and takes its name from Saint Joseph and from the Monte Casto, a mountain which dominates from north the village.

History 
Since 1929 San Giuseppe di Casto was a separate comune (municipality).

References

External links

Frazioni of the Province of Biella
Former municipalities of the Province of Biella
Andorno Micca